Winterbach is a municipality in the district of Günzburg in Bavaria in Germany.

Mayor
The mayor is Reinhard Schieferle, in office since May 2020.

Previous mayors:
2008–2020: Karl Oberschmid (Wählervereinigung Waldkirch).
1980–2008: Josef Schieferle

References

Populated places in Günzburg (district)